Kathryn Sikkink (born 1955) is an author, human rights academic, and scholar of international relations working primarily through the theoretical strain of constructivism. She is currently a professor at Harvard Kennedy School.

Academic career

Kathryn Sikkink started her studies at the University of Minnesota studying International Relations. She graduated in 1980 summa cum laude. She went on to receive her master's in political science, international relations from Columbia University in 1983. Sikkink briefly studied at the Institute for Latin American and Iberian Studies at Columbia University in 1984 where she earned a Certificate of Latin American and Iberian Studies. Staying at Columbia, she earned her Ph.D. in political science, international relations with distinction.

Prior to her career at Harvard University, Sikkink previously served as a Regents Professor and the McKnight Presidential Chair of Political Science at the University of Minnesota. Currently she is the Ryan Family Professor of Human Rights Policy and the Carol K. Pforzheimer Professor at the Radcliffe Institute for Advanced Study at the John F. Kennedy School of Government, Harvard University. Sikkink studies international norms and institutions, transnational advocacy networks, the impact of human rights law and policies, and transitional justice.

In 2008, Sikkink received a Guggenheim Fellowship. In 2012, she won the Robert F. Kennedy Book Award for her book on international human rights titled The Justice Cascade, which discusses the origins and effects of human rights trials on geopolitics and global justice. She was elected to the American Philosophical Society in 2013. She is also the recipient of the Grawemeyer World Order Award for her book (with Margaret Keck) Activists Beyond Borders (1998). In 2017, Sikkink released the essay Evidence for Hope: Making Human Rights Work in the 21st Century, where she states that human rights institutions have been successful in their goals, despite their flaws and limitations, and will continue to deliver in the next years.

References

University of Minnesota faculty
Living people
1955 births
Radcliffe fellows
Columbia University alumni
Members of the American Philosophical Society
University of Minnesota alumni
Harvard Kennedy School faculty